Erin Township is located in Stephenson County, Illinois. As of the 2010 census, its population was 410 and it contained 177 housing units. The unincorporated community of Eleroy is located in the township.

Geography
Erin is Township 27 North, Range 6 (part) East of the Fourth Principal Meridian.

Stagecoach inns
The Stage Inn (Section 14) was built along the Old State Road number 2, now U.S. Route 20, ½ mile east of Eleroy. The stone inn was a stop for the Frink, Walker & Company stage line that operated from Chicago to Galena 1839–1854. A stone barn across the road from the inn was demolished.

Demographics

References

External links
City-data.com
Stephenson County Official Site

Townships in Stephenson County, Illinois
Townships in Illinois